Monty Python's Big Red Book is a humour book comprising mostly material derived and reworked from the first two series of the Monty Python's Flying Circus BBC television series. Edited by Eric Idle, it was first published in the UK in 1971 by Methuen Publishing Ltd. It was later published in the United States in 1975 by Warner Books.

As well as the comedy content, the title itself is a humorous reference to Mao Zedong's Little Red Book— despite the title, the book has a blue cover. To add to the confusion, the credits page refers to it as Monty Python's Big Brown Book.

The book contains some stills of footage shot for And Now For Something Completely Different but not used, including "Ken Shabby" and "Le Pouff Celebre/Flying Sheep".

Shortly after publication the book ran into trouble when a music publishing company objected to the use of their trade name being used on the "Bing Tiddle Tiddle Bong" sheet music. After the first 75,000 copies were sold, all subsequent editions removed the reference to "The Wright Ukulele Tutor" and replaced it with "The Volti Subito".

In 1972 a paperback edition was issued with the words "Special New Hardback Edition" replacing the "Very Urgent" sticker on the front cover. In 1981 both this book and The Brand New Monty Python Bok were reissued as a hardback book entitled The Complete Works Of Shakespeare And Monty Python: Volume One – Monty Python. Paperback editions of both these books were reissued again in 1986 as The Monty Python Gift Boks, sold together inside an outer cover which folded out into a mini poster.

In 2008 Monty Python's Big Red Book was referenced in the Doctor Who episode "Silence in the Library".

Contents
 Forewords
 Advertisements
 Juliette – Ken Shabby & Rosemary, A True Love Story Of Our Times
 Credits
 Why Accountancy Is Not Boring
 Naughty Pages
 Join The Professionals
 The Silly Party
 Keyhole For voyeurs
 Batley Ladies Townswomen's Guild
 E.D. Silly's Page
 Spam
 Sports Page
 Arts Page
 Horace Poem
 The World Encyclopedia Of Carnal Knowledge
 Australia Page
 Children's Page
 Postal Blackmail
 A Song For Europe
 The Importance Of Being Earnest
 Are You Civilised?
 Le Pouff Celebre
 Madame Palm Writes
 The Family Tree Of Johann Gambolputty...
 The Greatest Upper Class Race In The World
 What To Look For In A Great Twit
 Lumberjack Song
 Do-It-Yourself Story
 Goat's Page
 Hello O.N.s Everywhere
 Whizzo Assortment
 English To Hungarian Phrasebook
 Johnson's Novelties
 How To Walk Silly
 Be A Modern Hermit
 The Poems Of Ewen McTeagle
 The Piranha Brothers
 Python Literary Guild
 Bibliography

Credits
 Authors – Graham Chapman, John Cleese, Eric Idle, Terry Jones, Michael Palin
 Illustrator – Terry Gilliam
 Editor – Eric Idle
 Photography – Doug Webb, BBC News Picture Library, The Radio Times, Hulton Picture Library, John Horton, Tony Sullivan
 Art Director – Derek Birdsall
 Art Editor/Lay-out – Katy Hepburn
 Artwork – Roger Hudson, Stephen Scales
 Music Arranger – Fred Tomlinson

References

1971 books
Monty Python literature
Comedy books